Plagiognathus tsugae is a species of plant bugs in the family Miridae. It is found in North America.

References

 Schuh, Randall T. (2001). "Revision of New World Plagiognathus Fieber, with comments on the Palearctic fauna and the description of a new genus (Heteroptera: Miridae: Phylinae)". Bulletin of the American Museum of Natural History, no. 266, 267.
 Thomas J. Henry, Richard C. Froeschner. (1988). Catalog of the Heteroptera, True Bugs of Canada and the Continental United States. Brill Academic Publishers.

Further reading

 Arnett, Ross H. (2000). American Insects: A Handbook of the Insects of America North of Mexico. CRC Press.

Plagiognathus
Insects described in 1923